The National Tramway Museum in Crich, Derbyshire, has a large and diverse fleet of heritage tramcars, and aims to illustrate the complete development of the traditional British Tramcar. Where it is not possible to show this, tramcars from places as far away as Berlin, the Hague, Douglas, Halle, Howth, Johannesburg, New York City, Porto, Prague and Sydney have been acquired to show this. The majority of the trams at Crich are double-deck trams built between 1900 and 1930, and several have open tops. There are a few trams in the collection that were built after the Second World War, and these give an idea of how the British Tram Industry may have developed if services had not declined.

The museum have part of their website dedicated to the histories of the trams in their collection which can be found here.

Fleet list

Passenger trams

Works trams and vehicles

Buses

References

Tram vehicles of the United Kingdom